A motorpool is a group of motor vehicles whose use is shared on a short-term basis by the personnel of an organization, such as a governmental agency or military installation. The term can also refer to the place where such vehicles are parked when not in use, and to the staff that manages the vehicles and or maintains them such that they are operable and ready for use when requested.

See also
 Carpool, the sharing of car journeys so that more than one person travels in each car
 Carsharing, involving a group of vehicles whose usage is shared among the general public or a membership group
 Fleet vehicle, an internally shared resource owned or leased by a business, government agency or other entity

Motor vehicles